The USCGC Firebush (WLB-393) was a  belonging to the United States Coast Guard launched on 3 February 1944 and commissioned on 20 July 1944. She was eventually transferred to the Nigerian Navy in June 2003.

Design
The Iris-class buoy tenders were constructed after the Mesquite-class buoy tenders. She was powered by one electric motor. This was connected up to two Westinghouse generators which were driven by two CooperBessemer GND-8 four-cycle diesel engines. It had a single screw.

The ships had a complement of six officers and seventy-four crew members in 1945; this decreased to two warrants, four officers, and forty-seven men in 1966. They were fitted with a SL1 radar system and QBE-3A sonar system in 1945. Their armament consisted of one 3"/50 caliber gun, two 20 mm/80 guns, two Mousetraps, two depth charge tracks, and four Y-guns in 1945; these were removed in 1966.

Career 

Firebush was first assigned to the 3rd Coast Guard District and homeported in St. George, Staten Island, and later to Governors Island, NY, where she was used for ATON duties during the end of World War II. In June 1979, she was transferred to Kodiak, Alaska to assist with ATON in Alaskan waters. During her time there, she tended 140 aids to navigation including 83 buoys. In May 2003, Firebush was decommissioned and turned over to the Nigerian Navy.

See also
 List of United States Coast Guard cutters

References

External links

Historic American Engineering Record in Alaska
Iris-class seagoing buoy tenders
1943 ships
Ships of the Nigerian Navy
Ships built in Duluth, Minnesota
Ships transferred from the United States Coast Guard to the Nigerian Navy